Persea glabra is a species of plant in the family Lauraceae. It is endemic to Brazil.

References

Flora of Brazil
glabra
Vulnerable plants
Taxonomy articles created by Polbot